Museo diocesano di Lanciano (Italian for Diocesan Museum of Lanciano)  is a  museum of religious art in Lanciano, Province of Chieti (Abruzzo).

History

Collection

Notes

External links

Lanciano
Museums in Abruzzo
Lanciano